Caridina masapi is a freshwater shrimp from Sulawesi. The species is endemic to the Malili lake system. It is commonly found on rocky substrate.

Threats
The species is under threat by pollution from a nickel mine, eutrophication by nearby human activity, invasive species like the flowerhorn cichlid and pacu and excessive harvesting for the aquarium trade.

References

Atyidae
Freshwater crustaceans of Asia
Endemic freshwater shrimp of Sulawesi
Crustaceans described in 1937